Günther von Scheven (17 April 1908 – 21 March 1942) was a German sculptor. His work was part of the sculpture event in the art competition at the 1936 Summer Olympics; a medal he designed received an honorary mention. He was killed in action in Ukraine during the Second World War.

He studied philosophy in Heidelberg and Berlin, but also did a craft training and studied sculpture. He was a close friend of Georg Kolbe, who published his biography in 1944. His gravesite remains unknown.

References

1908 births
1942 deaths
People from Krefeld
20th-century German sculptors
20th-century German male artists
Summer Olympics competitors for Germany
German Army personnel killed in World War II
Olympic competitors in art competitions
Artists from North Rhine-Westphalia
Military personnel from Krefeld